= Mallappuram =

Coordinates: 9.828°N 77.673°E

Mallappuram is a village in Madurai district, India.

== Geography ==
Mallappuram is in Madurai district, Periaiyur Taluk, near Usilampatti to M. Kallupatti (Elumalai). It has an average elevation of 350 metres (1,150 ft).

Mallappuram is a village nearly 23 km from Usilampatti

Educational institutions in the village include Thiruvalluvar Teacher Training Institute, B.Ed., M.Ed. Colleges, Tamil Thai Teacher Training Institute, and Thiruvalluvar Polytechnic College.

== Demographics ==
As of 2001, Mallappuram had a population of 11,030. Males constituted 50% of the population and females 50%. Mallapuram had an average literacy rate of 56%, lower than the national average of 59.5%: male literacy is 67%, and female literacy is 45%. In Mallappuram, 10% of the population is under 6 years of age. Most of the population are business people.
